Ituzaingó is a small town of San José Department of southern Uruguay.

Geography

History
It was declared a "Pueblo" (village) by Decree of 23 October 1875. On 15 October 1963, its status was elevated to "Villa" (town) by the Act of Ley Nº 13.167.

Population
In 2011 Ituzaingó had a population of 771.
 
Source: Instituto Nacional de Estadística de Uruguay

References

External links
INE map of Ituzaingó

Populated places in the San José Department